In 2007, Kent County Cricket Club competed in Division One of the County Championship, the South Conference of the 50-over Friends Provident Trophy, Division Two of the NatWest Pro40 and the South Division of the Twenty20 Cup. Kent also hosted a List A match against the touring Sri Lanka A team and a three-day match without first-class status against Cardiff UCCE, both at the St Lawrence Ground.

The team narrowly avoided relegation from Division One of the County Championship, with a number of matches affected by rain including one match in Worcester that was abandoned without a ball being bowled. In List A cricket, Kent finished mid-table in both the South Conference of the Friends Provident Trophy and Division Two of the Natwest Pro40 (although they only missed out on promotion in the latter tournament by a single point).

The highlight of the season was victory at finals day of the Twenty20 Cup at Edgbaston on 4 August. Kent defeated Sussex in their semi-final by 5 wickets, and then later in the day beat Gloucestershire by 4 wickets – aided by a hat-trick by Ryan McLaren – to win the title for the first time.

Squad
Rob Key was re-appointed as club captain ahead of the 2007 season. Key lead a new-look squad, including overseas signing Yasir Arafat (the Pakistan all-rounder joined after having played for Sussex in 2006). Yasir would be Kent's second overseas player for 2007, joining South African all-rounder Andrew Hall. Following the 2006 season, Kent had released former captain David Fulton, wicket-keeper Niall O'Brien and bowlers Simon Cusden, Matthew Dennington and David Stiff.

Due to international commitments, Hall was away from the county during the group stage of the Twenty20 Cup in the second half of June and early July. Kent signed another South African, fast bowler Morné Morkel, to play in these eight T20 matches. After returning for two County Championship matches, Hall then left the county again in late-July and this time was replaced by Sri Lankan fast bowler Lasith Malinga on a short-term contract until the end of the season.

Left-arm spinner Min Patel retained the vice-captaincy, but injury restricted him to just a single championship appearance plus the tour match against Sri Lanka A (in which he captained a mostly young side) and he retired at the end of the season. Patel made his debut for Kent in 1989, earned two Test caps for England in 1996, and took a total of 630 first class wickets as well as 88 in List A and 15 in Twenty20 cricket (he played very little limited overs cricket in the latter years of his career). Patel had been at Kent throughout his career, also playing a short spell for Central Districts in New Zealand ahead of the 2006 English summer.

Squad list
 Ages given as of the first day of the County Championship season, 18 April 2007.

County Championship

Division One

Matches

Friends Provident Trophy

South Conference

Matches

NatWest Pro40

Division Two

Matches

Other List A match

Tour match

Twenty20 Cup

South Division

Matches

Quarter-finals

Semi-finals

Final

UCCE match
Kent's 3-day match against Cardiff UCCE in April did not have first-class status.

Statistics

Batting

Bowling

References

External links
Kent home at ESPN cricinfo
Kent County Cricket Club official site

2007
2007 in English cricket